State Route 259 (SR 259) is a primary state highway in the U.S. state of Virginia. The two sections of SR 259 are joined by West Virginia Route 259 (WV 259).

Route description

SR 259 begins at the diamond interchange between I-81 and US 11 (Valley Pike) at Mauzy. The south leg of the intersection between the state highway and the U.S. Highway is the entrance ramp to southbound I-81. The exit ramp from southbound I-81 alights at the state highway just north of its terminal intersection. SR 259 heads northwest as two-lane undivided Mayland Road, which passes through Mayland on its way to Broadway. The state highway veers north and enters the town at its intersection with SR 259 Alternate (Broadway Avenue), which splits west toward the center of the town. At Lee Street, the road continues north as SR 42 (Timber Way); SR 259 turns west onto Lee Street and runs concurrently to the north end of downtown Broadway. There, SR 42 turns south onto Main Street and SR 259 Alternate has its western terminus. SR 259 continues west through a grade crossing of the Chesapeake Western Railway and leaves the town.

SR 259 continues west as Brocks Gap Road, which parallels the North Fork Shenandoah River. The state highway passes through Cootes Store before following the river through Brocks Gap, a water gap in Little North Mountain. West of Fulks Run, SR 259 follows the river as its curves north into George Washington National Forest. The state highway veers away from the river as it curves west again toward Bergton. SR 259 follows Capon Run north to the northern end of its southern section at the West Virginia state line. The highway continues north as WV 259, which passes through Baker and Wardensville before returning to Virginia at High View. SR 259 heads northeast along Carpers Pike to its northern terminus at US 50 (Northwestern Turnpike) just west of Gore in western Frederick County.

Major intersections

Alternate Route

Virginia State Route 259 Alternate forms a loop through downtown Broadway. From Lee Street, it follows Main Street south in a concurrency with SR 42, then turns east on Broadway Avenue before rejoining SR 259.

References

External links

Virginia Highways Project: VA 259

259
State Route 259
State Route 259